Cho Suk-jae (born 24 March 1993) is a South Korean footballer who plays as a striker.

Career
Cho joined Chungju Hummel on loan soon after signing with Jeonbuk Hyundai Motors in 2015. He made his first goal on 19 April against FC Anyang. In the 2016 season, he was loaned to the Jeonnam Dragons. After the season, he was loaned to FC Anyang during the 2017 season.

On 1 February 2018, Cho signed for Lokomotiv Tashkent.

References

External links 

1993 births
Living people
Association football forwards
South Korean expatriate footballers
South Korean footballers
Jeonbuk Hyundai Motors players
Chungju Hummel FC players
Jeonnam Dragons players
PFC Lokomotiv Tashkent players
FC Anyang players
K League 1 players
K League 2 players
Uzbekistan Super League players
Konkuk University alumni